Julien Hériteau (born 12 September 1994) is a French rugby union player. His position is Centre and he currently plays for Clermont in the Top 14. Julien is a product of the Agen youth system, first playing for the first team in 2014.

He is known for his work rate, strength and passion for the game of rugby. A typically hard charging French Centre.

In late December 2018 it was announced that Hériteau had signed a 3 year contract with rival Top 14 club RC Toulon. Making his debut soon after.

International career

In 2020, Hériteau was called up for the first time for his country, France. In preparation for the 2020 Six Nations Championship. Following Fabien Galthié's appointment as new head coach of the French national side. Hériteau, one of 42 initial players chosen to partake in pre-tournament training and test matches.

References

External links
 ALLRUGBY Profile

1994 births
Living people
French rugby union players
SU Agen Lot-et-Garonne players
ASM Clermont Auvergne players
Rugby union centres